The Liberty Bell Memorial Museum is located at 1601 Oak Street, Melbourne, Florida in Wells Park and is located adjacent to Melbourne Military Memorial Park. The museum is free to enter, and is divided into two main components: The Rotunda of American History and Freedom Hall.

History
Honor America Inc., a non-profit organization dedicated to American history and heritage, founded the Liberty Bell Memorial Museum. It is housed in a former concrete ground water storage tank and the pump house of the original Melbourne Water Works
 Architect Joe Vislay designed the water storage tank and pump house and contractor Robert Stitzel built it. The organization. expanded the museum in 2005, adding the Freedom Hall annex . In 2013, the museum won the Colonel John H. Magruder III Award given by the Marine Corps Historical Foundation for excellence in depicting Marine Corps history.

Exhibits 
The Rotunda houses exhibits relating to American history, including a timeline of the history of the American nation, patriotic and historic artifacts and ephemera, Florida-specific history, and a full size replica of the Liberty Bell. The replica bell was cast by Whitechapel Bell Foundry, the casters of the original bell  for the Pennsylvania State House (what is now called Independence Hall). It was purchased with funds raised by local schoolchildren during the U.S. Bicentennial Celebration.

Freedom Hall houses militaria relating to each branch of the U.S. Armed Forces and educational exhibits regarding major conflicts in which the United States has been a belligerent.

See also
 American Revolution
 Liberty Bell Museum in Allentown, Pennsylvania

Notes

Gallery

External links

Liberty Bell Memorial Museum (official website)

Buildings and structures in Melbourne, Florida
History museums in Florida
Military and war museums in Florida
Museums in Brevard County, Florida
Museums established in 1985
1985 establishments in Florida